Action Half-Life is a mod for the first-person shooter video game Half-Life. It strives to simulate action movies, especially those directed by John Woo.

Action Half-Life is the second mod in the "Action" series.  The first was Action Quake 2 and the third was Action Unreal Tournament 2004.

Gameplay 

The traditional mode of gameplay is Deathmatch; at the start of a round, players must choose a single pistol, unique weapon, and a special item. Unlike the buy menu in Counter-Strike, these weapons are free and have limited ammunition, which makes tactical usage crucial. The game also includes a "last man standing" mode, which plays like deathmatch, but without respawning after death.

Action Half-life also features a single player mode. Some unique features in this mode include a move called "Adrenaline Rush", which is similar to Bullet Time.

Reception 

Action Half-Life was the favored modification for a small subculture described by Rock, Paper, Shotgun's writer Quintin Smith as a "mad cabal of mappers who obsessed over easter eggs", with some levels containing secret areas much larger and complex than the main level. These often included whole story-lines, puzzles, and scripted sequences.

See also 
 List of GoldSrc engine mods

References

Sources

External links 

 Ministry of Action homepage

1999 video games
First-person shooters
GoldSrc mods
Multiplayer online games
Multiplayer video games
Windows games